The Lakeland Freeway (often called "Route 2" in the section that carries solely Ohio State Route 2) is a limited-access freeway in the northeastern suburbs of Cleveland, Ohio.  It runs with and parallel to Interstate 90, and follows the shore of Lake Erie, linking the suburban areas of Lake County to Cleveland and Cuyahoga County.

Route description

The Lakeland Freeway passes through the municipalities of Cleveland, Euclid, Wickliffe, Willowick, Willoughby, Eastlake, Mentor, Painesville, and Painesville Township. The freeway is eight lanes in the I-90/SR 2 section. The SR 2 section to the east had consisted of six lanes only to Vine Street, but the third lane in each direction was extended to SR 44 between 2006 and 2012. It then narrows to four lanes from there to its eastern terminus in Painesville Township at US 20. The freeway has seen tremendous growth since it opened in the 1960s. In 2003, average daily traffic ranged from about 94,100 at the I-90/SR 2 split to 31,200 east of Painesville.

History
The Lake County section of freeway was authorized by Lake County Commissioners in 1957, and constructed and opened to traffic in the early 1960s. It was blended into the Cleveland Memorial Shoreway at the western end in Cuyahoga County; because of that, the "Shoreway" name is often applied to the Lakeland Freeway from its west end to the I-90/SR 2 split.

Exit list

See also

References

External links
"Memorial Shoreway" from the Encyclopedia of Cleveland History - has Lakeland Freeway reference.
The Unofficial Ohio State Highways Web Site, by John Simpson
End photos of Ohio 2 from state-ends.com by Dan Garnell

Transportation in Cleveland
Transportation in Lake County, Ohio
Cleveland area expressways
Interstate 90